The Maida Vale Hospital for Nervous Diseases was a hospital that existed from 1867 to 1993.Y

History
The hospital was founded as the London Infirmary for Epilepsy and Paralysis by the German physician Julius Althaus (1833-1900) in 1867. In its first incarnation it was based at Blandford Place in Marylebone. It moved to Portland Terrace in 1872, becoming the Hospital for Diseases of the Nervous System in 1873 and the Hospital for Epilepsy and Paralysis in 1876. It moved to a new building in Maida Vale, designed by the architects Young & Hall, opened by the Duchess of Argyll in 1903. At that time it became the Hospital for Epilepsy and Paralysis and Other Diseases of the Nervous System, Maida Vale. It became the Maida Vale Hospital for Nervous Diseases (including Epilepsy and Paralysis) in 1937.

The facility joined the National Health Service as the National Hospital for Nervous Diseases, Maida Vale at which time it also became part of the National Hospitals for Nervous Diseases, now the National Hospital for Neurology and Neurosurgery. The site at 4 Maida Vale (the main road) was closed in 1993 and sold for development.

See also
 Leonard Guthrie

References 

Defunct hospitals in London
1867 establishments in England
1993 disestablishments in England
Hospitals established in 1867